Corallus annulatus, known as the ringed tree boa, annulated tree boa, and northern annulated tree boa, is a boa species found in Central and South America. Three subspecies are currently recognized, including the nominate subspecies described here. Like all boas, it is a non-venomous constrictor.

Description
The color pattern consists of a brownish-red ground color overlaid with blackish rings or netlike reticulations.

Geographic range
Found in Central America in eastern Guatemala, Honduras, Nicaragua, Costa Rica, Panama. Also in South America in Pacific Colombia and northwestern Ecuador. The type locality given is "Costa Rica."

Subspecies

References

Further reading

 Peters JA, Orejas-Miranda B. 1970. Catalogue of the Neotropical Squamata: Part 1. Snakes. Bull. U.S. Natl. Mus. 297: 1–347.

External links
 

annulatus
Snakes of Central America
Snakes of South America
Reptiles of Guatemala
Reptiles of Panama
Reptiles described in 1875
Taxa named by Edward Drinker Cope